John O'Neal(l) may refer to:

John O'Neal (Medal of Honor) (born 1841), U.S. sailor who was awarded the Medal of Honor
John O'Neal (politician) (active since 2010), American politician in West Virginia
John H. O'Neall (1838–1907), American politician from Indiana
John Belton O'Neall, judge who served on the precursor to the South Carolina Supreme Court
Johnny O'Neal (born 1956), American pianist

See also
John O'Neil (disambiguation)
John O'Neill (disambiguation)